The JAC Refine S7 is a mid-size CUV that was produced by JAC Motors. In Mexico is assembled in CKD kits in Cudad Sahagún plant by Giant Motors and was renamed JAC Sei 7. In Latin America the vehicles was sold as JAC T80.

Overview

The Refine S7 was a mid-size crossover that was positioned above the compact Refine S5 crossover.

The engine lineup of the Refine S7 is exactly the same as the Refine A60 sedan. 

The Refine S7 is available in both five-seat and seven-seat versions. Pricing of the Refine S7 ranges from 109,800 yuan to 129,800 yuan. A facelift was launched in 2018 slightly altering the front grilles and bumper and changing the tail lamps to red.

References

External links
Official website

Refine S7
Mid-size sport utility vehicles
Crossover sport utility vehicles
Front-wheel-drive vehicles
Cars introduced in 2017
Cars of China